Oksbøl is a town in southwestern Jutland in the Varde Municipality, in Region of Southern Denmark. As of 1 January 2022, it has a population of 2,815.

Notable people 
 Æ Tinuser (in English The Tinus brothers) from Vrøgum, near Oksbøl, a Danish traditional band from the 1950s to the late 1970s

References 

Cities and towns in the Region of Southern Denmark
Varde Municipality